Warblington Meadow is a  biological Site of Special Scientific Interest west of Emsworth in Hampshire.

This site has areas of fresh and salt water marshes. It has a rich flora, with 158 species of flowering plants recorded, including marsh arrow-grass, ragged robin, creeping jenny, corky-fruited water-dropwort, bog  pimpernel and southern marsh orchid. There is also a small unpolluted brook lined with trees.

The site is private land with no public access.

References

 
Sites of Special Scientific Interest in Hampshire